Andy Long (born 2 September 1977) is a former English rugby union player who played at Hooker. He has 2 caps for England.

Originally a product of Bournemouth and the Bath academy, where he came to the attention of Bath coach Clive Woodward, having captained England U19 and U21.  Woodward was appointed England coach in 1997 and picked the 20-year-old on potential for his first match in charge against Australia.  However, Long was replaced at half-time by Richard Cockerill, who then started the subsequent matches against New Zealand with Long on the bench.  Long however did not again enter the field of play.  He thus seemed destined to become a "one cap wonder" until gaining a second cap against the United States in 2001 when most of the regular England players were away with the 2001 British Lions tour to Australia.  He also played for England in a non cap international against The Barbarians in 2003.

Meanwhile, Long spent 7 years at Bath, before joining Irish province Munster during the 2003 World Cup, after which he returned to England with Rotherham, who were relegated in 2004 and he travelled further north to join Newcastle Falcons.

He was called into the England Saxons squad to face Italy A in Ragusa, Sicily on 9 February 2008.

On 20 November 2009, he signed for Northampton Saints and made his debut for the first team against Sale Sharks in the LV cup which they won 20–14.

For the 2011/12 season joined Cambridge RUFC as forwards coach 
.

On 31 May 2012, he was forced to retire from rugby, due to the effects of a degenerative neck injury.

For the 2013/14/15 seasons he is the head coach at Bishop's Stortford RFC.

References

External links
Newcastle profile
England profile

CURFC
Cambridge News

1977 births
Living people
Bath Rugby players
England international rugby union players
English rugby union players
Munster Rugby players
Newcastle Falcons players
People educated at St Peter's Catholic School, Bournemouth
Rotherham Titans players
Rugby union hookers
Rugby union players from Poole